was a Japanese-born American astrophysicist who also wrote science fiction under the pseudonym Eric Kotani. He edited Requiem: New Collected Works by Robert A. Heinlein and Tributes to the Grand Master (1992), and contributed to New Destinies, Vol. VI/Winter 1988—Robert A. Heinlein Memorial Issue (1988), after his friend, writer Robert A. Heinlein, died in 1988.

Kondo also edited the non-fiction book Interstellar Travel & Multi-Generational Space Ships, part of the Apogee Books Space Series.

Kondo was also an accomplished teacher of Shodokan Aikido and judo.

Bibliography

 Act of God, Eric Kotani & John Maddox Roberts, Baen Books (1985, Baen e-book March 2013).
 The Island Worlds, E. Kotani & J.M. Roberts, Baen (1987, Baen e-book March 2013).
 Between the Stars, E. Kotani & J.M. Roberts, Baen (1988, Baen e-book April 2013).
 Delta Pavonis, E. Kotani & J.M. Roberts, Baen Books (1990, Baen e-book March 2013).
 Supernova, R. M. Allen & E. Kotani, Avon Books (1991).
 Requiem: New Collected Works by Robert A. Heinlein and Tributes to the Grand Master, ed. Y. Kondo, Tor Books (1992). (It became a Book of the Month selection and made the national best-seller list of the San Francisco Chronicle.)
 Death of a Neutron Star, E. Kotani, Pocket Books (1999).
 Legacy of Prometheus, E. Kotani & J. M. Roberts, Tom Doherty Associates (Tor Books) (2000).
 Kotani's short story, "The Edgeworld", is contained in the Martin Greenberg-John Helfer anthology Star Colonies, DAW Books (2000).
 Orbital Station Fear, E. Kotani, published in Teknobook anthology, Space Stations (2004).

References

External links
 Eric Kotani / Yoji Kondo website
 

1933 births
2017 deaths
20th-century Japanese novelists
21st-century Japanese novelists
Japanese science fiction writers
20th-century Japanese astronomers
Japanese astrophysicists